Avimor is a census-designated place (CDP) in Ada County, Idaho, United States. It is on the northern edge of the county, bordered to the northeast by Boise County and to the west by Idaho State Highway 55. The Spring Valley is in the western part of the CDP.

Avimor was first listed as a CDP prior to the 2020 census.

References 

Census-designated places in Ada County, Idaho
Census-designated places in Idaho